The  has its source in Mount Norikura (乗鞍岳 Norikura-ga-take) in Takayama, Gifu Prefecture, Japan. It flows from the northern to the southern section of the prefecture before emptying into the Kiso River in Minokamo.

River communities
The river passes through or forms the boundary of the communities listed below.

Gifu Prefecture
Takayama, Gero, Shirakawa (Ōno District), Yaotsu, Hichisō, Kawabe, Minokamo

References

External links
 (mouth)

Rivers of Gifu Prefecture
Rivers of Japan